Catocala dariana is a moth in the family Erebidae. It is found in Afghanistan.

References

dariana
Moths described in 1996
Moths of Asia